Marjorie Nellie, Lady Murray (née Culverwell) (3 October 1924 – 6 February 2010) was a British administrator and one of the last living people to witness the Nuremberg and Tokyo war crimes trials. She was married to Sir Donald Murray, who served as British ambassador to Libya from 1974 to 1976.

Lady Murray worked at the GCHQ on weather translations. She learnt German from her father who was held prisoner of war during World War I. She transferred to Supreme Headquarters Allied Expeditionary Force in Grosvenor Square, London, where she was one of the few who knew the planned date of the D-Day landings. After the liberation of Paris, she transferred there, then to Germany to work on the Nuremberg Trials.

Soon after returning from Germany she was sent to Japan to work on the Tokyo trial. After she and her husband retired they moved to Kent.

Lady Murray died on 6 February 2010. Her husband predeceased her.  She was survived by her four children.

References

1924 births
2010 deaths
GCHQ people
Nuremberg trials
Wives of knights